Andrew Timothy Ritchie (born 28 November 1960) is an English former footballer and manager.

Playing career
Ritchie was born in Manchester. After playing for England Schoolboys (once scoring three goals against Germany), he started his career in 1977–78 with Manchester United and scored a hat-trick against Leeds United while aged just 18 and another hat-trick against Spurs when 19, but was then surprisingly sold to Brighton & Hove Albion.

He was later sold to Leeds United, where he made some fine performances, notably in the 1984–85 season when he scored two hat-tricks. He also helped the club reach the semi-finals of the FA Cup in the 1986–87 season.

He served the Elland Road club until 1987, when he signed for Oldham Athletic. He would stay at Oldham for eight years, during one of the most successful periods of the club's history. This included a run to the final of the Football League Cup in 1990, reaching the FA Cup semi-finals in the same year (where they took Manchester United to a replay), before sealing the Second Division title in 1991. They stayed in the top flight for three years, becoming founder members of the FA Premier League in 1992, and reached another FA Cup semi-final in 1994, where Oldham took a 1–0 lead against Manchester United in extra time before a late equaliser forced a replay, which Oldham lost 4–1.

On leaving Oldham in 1995, he spent two years in Division Three with Scarborough.

In his senior career, he made 661 appearances (88 as substitute) and scored 210 goals. He played his last game, for Oldham, in the 1998–99 season, by which time he had returned to the Boundary Park club as player–coach.

Contrary to popular belief, Ritchie's nickname "Stitches" was not a fresh idea from his career. His actual nickname 'Scratch' (from which Stitches is derived) came from his school mates at Cheadle Moseley Grammar School for Boys. Ritchie is regarded as one of Oldham's finest ever footballers, and is also an ex-manager of the club. During the '89–'90 "pinch me season" when the Latics got to the final of the League Cup and the semi-final of the FA Cup he was the club's top scorer with 28 goals. Most notably in the 2–2 draw at Southampton he scored in the dying seconds to keep the Latics in the competition, also the equaliser in the replay of the FA Cup semi final against his former club which forced the game into extra time (although the result ended 2–1 to Manchester United). Ritchie was said to be the best schoolboy footballer in Europe during the mid-1970s.

He is still very highly regarded by the Latics fans who still chant his name with the song "Andy Ritchie's Magic".

Managerial career
Following the sacking of Graeme Sharp, he returned to Oldham in March 1997 initially as Neil Warnock's assistant, but Warnock left to manage Bury at the end of the following season and Ritchie was appointed manager. His first season the team struggled with a small budget he had to rely mostly on youth players and the club survived relegation to the first team and the prospect of being the first Founder Members of the Premier League to be relegated to the bottom Division. The following season despite a bad start he managed to turn the fortunes around with some impressive displays, most notably the endings of top of the table Wigan's unbeaten record. The 2000–01 season was similar to the previous season with the club recovering from a poor start but the signing of David Eyres and Tony Carss helped steer the club to midtable safety. In the summer of 2001 the club was taken over by businessman Chris Moore, initially the club started the 2001–02 season well but following a poor run of results he was dismissed in November.

After a successful spell back at Elland Road in charge of Youth Development, Ritchie left to become Paul Hart's assistant at Barnsley. After Hart was sacked in March 2005, Ritchie's successful spell as caretaker manager led to him being confirmed as full-time manager in May 2005. In the 2005–06 season, he led the club to the League One playoff final against Swansea City. The match was played on 27 May 2006 at the Millennium Stadium in Cardiff. Barnsley's victory on penalties (following a 2–2 draw) secured promotion to the Football League Championship.

Ritchie was approached by Sheffield Wednesday about their vacant manager's position, following the sacking of Paul Sturrock in October 2006. However, the request was turned down by Barnsley. Ritchie was sacked by Barnsley on 21 November 2006, with the team in the relegation zone of the League Championship.

Ritchie was appointed Huddersfield Town manager on 11 April 2007. He left the club by mutual consent on 1 April 2008 after an indifferent season, ironically following an embarrassing 4–1 defeat at the hands of his former club Oldham Athletic on 29 March. He managed the team for 51 games, winning 22, losing 24 and drawing 5. The highlight was undoubtedly the FA Cup run which saw Town win against Birmingham City and before bowing out to Premier League outfit Chelsea in the 5th Round, the first time the club had been that far for 10 years.

He is currently doing punditry for BBC Radio Leeds and MUTV (Manchester United TV), and was in the frame for the vacant manager's job at Football League Two side Grimsby Town, following the sacking of Alan Buckley. However Ritchie was overlooked for the job which in turn went to Mike Newell.

Managerial statistics

Honours

As a player
Individual
PFA Team of the Year: 1989–90 Second Division

As a manager
Barnsley
Football League One play-offs: 2005–06

Individual
League One Manager of the Month: March 2005, October 2005

References

External links

1960 births
Living people
Footballers from Manchester
English footballers
England under-21 international footballers
Association football forwards
English football managers
Manchester United F.C. players
Brighton & Hove Albion F.C. players
Leeds United F.C. players
Scarborough F.C. players
Oldham Athletic A.F.C. players
Oldham Athletic A.F.C. managers
Barnsley F.C. managers
Huddersfield Town A.F.C. managers
Premier League players
English Football League players